Pascal Meiser (born 7 March 1975) is a German politician. Born in Saarbrücken, Saarland, he represents The Left. Pascal Meiser has served as a member of the Bundestag from the state of Berlin since 2017.

Life 
In Lebach he passed his school-leaving examination at the Johannes-Kepler Gymnasium in 1994. He then studied political science, journalism and psychology at the Johannes-Gutenberg-University Mainz, the University of Leeds and the Free University Berlin. After graduating in political science in 2005, he trained as a trade union secretary at IG Metall. He became member of the bundestag after the 2017 German federal election. He is a member of the Committee for Economics and Energy. He is the spokesman for his group on services policy.

References

External links 

  
 Bundestag biography 

1975 births
Living people
Members of the Bundestag for Berlin
Members of the Bundestag 2021–2025
Members of the Bundestag 2017–2021
Members of the Bundestag for The Left
People from Saarbrücken